Srećković is a Serbian surname derived form a masculine given name Srećko. It may refer to:

Aleksandar Srećković (born 1981), footballer
Nenad Srećković (born 1988), footballer
Nikola Srećković (born 1996), footballer
Panta Srećković (1834–1903), historian
Srđan Srećković (born 1974), politician

Serbian surnames